Townsville State High School, also known as Town High, is a secondary school in Railway Estate, Townsville, Queensland, Australia.

History 
Townsville State High School was established in 1924 as part of the Townsville Technical College at the northwest corner of Stanley and Walker Streets in Townsville CBD; that building later become a TAFE campus. The High School was re-located to 36-64 Boundary St, Railway Estate, Townsville in 1965.

Principals 
The principals of Townsville State High School include:
 October 2015- : Rob Slater (current)
 2013-2015: Frank Greene, retired
 2012: Scott Stewart,  now the Member of the Queensland Legislative Assembly for Townsville
 2002-2006: Ian Smythe, now Chief Executive for Townsville Crocodiles

Houses
There are four houses at the school named after reefs off the Queensland coast: 
Warrior - blue 
Faraday - yellow
Brewer - red
Needle - green

Sport
Town High is known for its Basketball program called the Town High Tropics.  Town High has been involved in many programs such as jump rope for heart, Clean Up Australia day, Optiminds, Young Diplomats Program, ANZAC day march, Shave for a Cure, New Zealand ski trip, star struck, Inspiring Young Australians, CREST, Japan tour and hosting with the sister school Matsudo Mabashi as well as an "Energy Farm" that helps supply energy to the library.  Town High also has an extensive science program and a vertical curriculum allowing students to undertake subjects above their year level at their knowledge level.

Notable alumni
 Julian Assange, WikiLeaks co-founder, attended Townville State High School.

References 

Educational institutions established in 1924
Schools in Townsville
Public high schools in Queensland
Technical schools in Queensland
1924 establishments in Australia